The Davies Heights are an elevated area, roughly elliptical in form and  long, rising to  in north-central Fildes Peninsula, King George Island. It was named by the UK Antarctic Place-Names Committee for Robert E.S. Davies, British Antarctic Survey geologist who worked in this area, 1975–76.

References 

Mountains of King George Island (South Shetland Islands)